is a town located in Okhotsk Subprefecture, Hokkaido, Japan.

Ōzora was formed on March 31, 2006, as a result of the merger of the town of Memanbetsu, and the village of Higashimokoto.

Memanbetsu Village (later Memanbetsu Town) split from the Town of Abashiri (now the City of Abashiri) in 1921, and Higashimokoto Village split from Abashiri Town on February 11, 1947. Therefore, all of Ōzora's territory once was a part of Abashiri.

Many places in Ōzora, such as the train stations, the airport, and the high school are named after the former town of Memanbetsu, and Japanese airlines use "Memanbetsu" to refer to "Ōzora" as a destination.

Education
Ōzora operates public elementary and junior high schools.

In the Higashimokoto area:
Higashimokoto Elementary School 
Higashimokoto Junior High School
Higashimokoto Agricultural High School

In the Memanbetsu area:
Memanbetsu Elementary School
Memanbetsu Junior High School

Hokkaido Prefectural Board of Education operates Memanbetsu High School in Ōzora.

Transportation
Hokkaido Railway Company (JR Hokkaido) operates two stations on the Sekihoku Main Line:
Memambetsu Station
Nishi-Memambetsu Station

Memanbetsu Airport is located in Ōzora.

Mascot

It is a cute jet airliner. However, as an airliner, Soralucky is not allowed to tell its gender and asking questions about its gender is strictly prohibited. Whenever it flies, it carries and bring happiness to people. People can also ride inside the mascot. It known for doing sky marathons (for exercise) but is not good at rock-paper-scissors. Its favorite colours are white and moss phlox pink and has a huge appetite of cotton candy. It is created in 2006, unveiled in March 2007 and was given upgrades in December 2014 with addition of jet engines, windows and designs (especially the town emblem on its tail).

References

External links

 Official Website 
 Official Tourism Website 

Towns in Hokkaido